Juniperus virginiana, also known as eastern redcedar, red cedar, Virginian juniper, eastern juniper, red juniper, and other local names, is a species of juniper native to eastern North America from southeastern Canada to the Gulf of Mexico and east of the Great Plains. Further west it is replaced by the related Juniperus scopulorum (Rocky Mountain juniper) and to the southwest by Juniperus ashei (Ashe juniper).

Description 

The oldest tree reported, from West Virginia, was 940 years old. The bark is reddish-brown, fibrous, and peels off in narrow strips. The juvenile leaves are found on young plants up to 3 years old, and as scattered shoots on adult trees, usually in shade. The juniper berry is an important winter food for many birds, which disperse the wingless seeds. The trees are usually dioecious, with pollen and seed cones on separate trees, yet some are monoecious.

There are two varieties, which intergrade where they meet:
Juniperus virginiana var. virginiana is called eastern juniper / redcedar. It is found in eastern North America, from Maine, west to southern Ontario and South Dakota, south to northernmost Florida and southwest into the post oak savannah of east-central Texas. Cones are larger, ; scale leaves are acute at apex and bark is red-brown.
Juniperus virginiana var. silicicola (Small) E.Murray (syn. Sabina silicicola Small, Juniperus silicicola (Small) L.H.Bailey) is known as southern or sand juniper / redcedar. Habitat is along the Atlantic and Gulf coasts from the extreme southeastern corner of Virginia, south to central Florida and west to southeast Texas. Cones are smaller, ; scale leaves are blunt at apex and the bark is orange-brown. It is treated by some authors at the lower rank of variety, while others treat it as a distinct species.

Ecology 

Eastern juniper is a pioneer species, which means that it is one of the first trees to repopulate cleared, eroded, or otherwise damaged land. It is unusually long lived among pioneer species, with the potential to live over 900 years. It is commonly found in prairies or oak barrens, old pastures, or limestone hills, often along highways and near recent construction sites. It is an alternate host for cedar–apple rust, an economically significant fungal disease of apples, and some management strategies recommend the removal of J. virginiana near apple orchards

In many areas it is considered an invasive species, even if native. It is fire-intolerant, and was previously controlled by periodic wildfires. Low branches near the ground burn and provide a ladder that allows fire to engulf the whole tree. Grasses recover quickly from low severity fires that are characteristic of prairies that kept the trees at bay. With the urbanization of prairies, the fires have been stopped with roads, plowed fields, and other fire breaks, allowing J. virginiana and other trees to invade. Trees are destructive to grasslands if left unchecked, and are actively being eliminated by cutting and prescribed burning. The trees also burn very readily, and dense populations were blamed for the rapid spread of wildfires in drought stricken Oklahoma and Texas in 2005 and 2006.

Eastern juniper benefits from increased CO2 levels, unlike the grasses with which it competes. Many grasses are C4 plants that concentrate CO2 levels in their bundle sheaths to increase the efficiency of RuBisCO, the enzyme responsible for photosynthesis, while junipers are C3 plants that rely on (and may benefit from) the natural CO2 concentrations of the environment, although they are less efficient at fixing CO2 in general.

Damage done by J. virginiana includes outcompeting forage species in pastureland. The low branches and wide base occupy a significant portion of land area. The thick foliage blocks out most light, so few plants can live under the canopy. The needles that fall raise the pH of the soil, making it alkaline, which holds nutrients such as phosphorus, making it harder for plants to absorb them. However, studies have found that Juniperus virginiana forests that replace grasslands have a statistically insignificant decrease to a significant increase in levels of soil nitrogen. J. virginiana forests have higher overall nitrogen use efficiency (NUE), despite the common grassland species Andropogon gerardi having a far higher NUE during photosynthesis (PNUE). The forests store much greater amounts of carbon in both biomass and soil, with most of the additional carbon stored aboveground. There is no significant difference in soil microbial activity.

Cedar waxwings are fond of the "berries" of these junipers. It takes about 12 minutes for their seeds to pass through the birds' guts, and seeds that have been consumed by this bird have levels of germination roughly three times higher than those of seeds the birds did not eat. Many other birds (from bluebirds to turkeys) and many mammals also consume them.

Pollen 
The pollen of Eastern Red Cedar (Juniperus virginiana) is a known allergen. This variety is native to Eastern North America, north of Mexico, with the pollen releasing at various points in the Spring, variable by latitude and elevation.

Uses 

The fragrant, finely grained, soft, brittle, very light, pinkish to brownish red heartwood is very durable, even in contact with soil. Because of its resistance to decay, fence posts are fashioned from the wood. Moths avoid the aromatic wood, and therefore it is in demand as lining for clothes chests and closets, which are often denominated "cedar closets" and "cedar chests". If correctly prepared, excellent English longbows, flatbows, and Native American sinew-backed bows can be made from it. It is marketed as "eastern redcedar" and "aromatic cedar". The best portions of the heartwood are one of the few woods that are suitable for making pencils, however the supply had so diminished by the 1940s that the wood of the incense-cedar largely replaced it.

Part of the commercially available cedar oil is produced by steam distillation from wood shavings. It contains a wide variety of terpenes. The three major components, alpha-cedrene, thujopsene and cedrol, constitute more than 60% of the essential oil. The fruits also yield an essential oil which contains mostly D-Limonene.

The oil derived from foliage and twigs has two main constituents: safrole and limonene. One minor compound is the podophyllotoxin, a non-alkaloid toxin lignan.

Native American tribes have historically used poles of juniper wood to demarcate agreed tribal hunting territories. French traders named Baton Rouge, Louisiana, which denotes "red stick", from the reddish color of these poles. Some nations continue to use it ceremonially.

The Cahokia Woodhenge series of timber circles that the pre-Columbian Mississippian culture in western Illinois erected were constructed of massive logs of eastern juniper.

Among many Native American cultures, the smoke of burning eastern juniper is believed to expel evil spirits prior to conducting a ceremony, such as a healing ceremony.

During the Dust Bowl drought of the 1930s, the Prairie States Forest Project encouraged farmers to plant shelterbelts, i. e. wind breaks, of eastern juniper throughout the Great Plains of the USA. The trees thrive in adverse conditions. Tolerant of both drought and cold, they grow well in rocky, sandy, and clayey soils. Competition between individual trees is minimal, and therefore they can be closely planted in rows, in which situation they still grow to full height, creating a solid windbreak in a short time.

A number of cultivars have been selected for horticulture, including 'Canaertii' (narrow conical; female) 'Corcorcor' (with a dense, erect crown; female), 'Goldspire' (narrow conical with yellow foliage), and 'Kobold' (dwarf). Some cultivars previously listed under this species, notably 'Skyrocket', are actually cultivars of J. scopulorum.

In the Arkansas, Missouri, and Oklahoma Ozarks, eastern juniper is commonly used as a Christmas tree.

This is the most widely used wood for making blocks for recorders. There are numerous properties that it possesses that make it uniquely suitable for this, such as good moisture absorption, low expansion when wet (so it does not crack the recorder head), and mild antiseptic properties.

See also 
Cedar wood

References

External links
 
Interactive Distribution Map of Juniperus virginiana 

virginiana
Dioecious plants
Trees of the Eastern United States
Trees of the North-Central United States
Trees of the Northeastern United States
Trees of the Southeastern United States
Trees of the Southern United States
Trees of the South-Central United States
Trees of the Great Lakes region (North America)
Trees of the Plains-Midwest (United States)
Flora of the Appalachian Mountains
Trees of Ontario
Plants described in 1753
Taxa named by Carl Linnaeus
Least concern flora of the United States
Garden plants of North America
Plants used in bonsai
Ornamental trees
Abortifacients